Ariarathes (Ariaráthēs) was the name of ten Hellenistic kings of Cappadocia in Anatolia, between the 4th and 1st centuries BC. They are:

 Ariarathes I of Cappadocia, ruled 331 or 330–322 BC, son of the Cappadocian satrap Ariamnes I
 Ariarathes II of Cappadocia, ruled 301–280 BC, satrap and king of Cappadocia, son of Holophernes and adopted son of Ariarathes I
 Ariarathes III of Cappadocia, reigned 262 or 255–220 BC, son of Ariamnes
 Ariarathes IV of Cappadocia, reigned 220–163 BC, son of Ariarathes III
 Ariarathes V of Cappadocia, reigned 163–130 BC or 126 BC, son of Ariarathes IV
 Ariarathes VI of Cappadocia, 130–111 BC, youngest son of Ariarathes V
 Ariarathes VII of Cappadocia, reigned 116–101 BC or 111 BC–100 BC), son of Ariarathes VI
 Ariarathes VIII of Cappadocia, reigned c. 101 – c. 96 BC and 95 BC–95 BC), king of Cappadocia, second son of Ariarathes VI 
 Ariarathes IX of Cappadocia, reigned c. 101–89 BC or 96 BC–95 BC, made king of Cappadocia by his father Mithridates VI, king of Pontus 
 Ariarathes X of Cappadocia, reigned c. 42 BC – 36 BC, became king after his brother Ariobarzanes III Philoromaios

See also
 List of rulers of Cappadocia